Tuenti Technologies, S.L.U is a mobile virtual network operator (MVNO) that operates with the Tuenti brand owned by Telefónica. It is a Spain-based tech company that focuses on providing a cloud-based services through its own application and its website to their customers.

Originally, Tuenti was created in 2006 as a social networking service, becoming the most popular social network among young people in Spain between 2009 and 2012. With over 15 million registered users, Tuenti was referred to as the "Spanish Facebook".

In Spain, Tuenti offered mobile telephone service. The mobile phone service in Spain was terminated on 1 June 2022. Contract customers were moved to O2 while prepaid customers were moved to Movistar.

In Latin America, Tuenti ships its brand through Telefónica branches in those countries, exploiting the young market by offering simple and affordable plans among other services common to mobile carriers, Tuenti offers free VoIP calls and instant messaging through its own messaging app.

Company history 

Tuenti was founded as a Social networking service in 2006 by a group of friends in Spain. Zaryn Dentzel, Felix Ruiz Hernandez, Kenny Bentley, Adeyemi Ajao and Joaquín Ayuso de Pául were the key people who worked together to bring Tuenti to life. Dentzel's first experience in Spain was on a students exchange program that took him to Cabeza del Buey (Badajoz). Bentley, the lead programmer, came to Spain after having worked in social networking in the United States. In the beginning, the project was aimed to university students, but due to its success, they opened to everyone, although it was only possible to register with an invitation. Years later the register was opened to everyone, in an attempt to make it available globally, with the only extra requirement of giving a phone number. Zaryn Dentzel has chronicled the story of Tuenti in a book called El futuro lo decides tú.

Although the name sounds similar to the English word twenty, it actually comes from "tu [id]enti[dad]", meaning "your identity". The service was originally targeted at the Spanish market, but in 2012 they made it globally available. The organization has reached more than 250 employees from more than 21 countries around the world.

Google Zeitgeist's 2009 listed Tuenti as the third fastest-rising global search. Google's 2008 Zeitgeist report listed Tuenti as the year's fourth fastest-rising global search term. In 2011, it was estimated that more than 15% of the web traffic in Spain was on Tuenti, which at that time in Spain meant more traffic than Google and Facebook together.

On August 4, 2010 the major telecommunications group Telefónica acquired 85% of tuenti's shares for a total of 70 million euro, becoming its largest shareholder.

In that same year, tuenti started the development of a light virtual mobile network operator which worked completely under the Movistar (Telefónica) infrastructure. Later, in December, the service, still in a developing state, is released to the users of the social network under the brand "Tu".

On the 11th of July 2012, tuenti announced a big renovation of its social network platform. It featured a new focus on mobile devices, availability in 12 new languages, and was called Tuenti Social Messenger, though, its attempt to become a global social network by officially supporting registers out of Spain was a failure. After a massive loss of active users, a big change on the company's drift occurred and its virtual mobile operator became the main focus.

On the 6th of November 2013, Telefónica owned 100% of the company after an agreement with the remaining shareholders.

Tuenti launched its mobile operator brand in Mexico, Peru and Argentina in 2014. After this move, the brand was present in four countries, offering competitive data bundles and started developing a cloud-based strategy. Tuenti has completely transformed its business from a social network to a mobile telecommunications provider.

During 2014, the company reported that their mobile operator represented 98% of the income. The company attained a global turnover of 21 million euro, 25% more than the previous year. Although it was still not positive, this year's financial report was the best since the launching of their mobile business and the acquisition by Telefónica.

In 2015, Sebastian Muriel is appointed as the new CEO of the company. He was already part of the mobile operator team for a long time before. During this year and 2016, Tuenti went through a rebranding and the company reaffirmed its commitment with the mobile market by completely renewing their website, which got rid of all the remaining social elements and functions. This year, Telefónica also started to make important changes in the management team: Sebastian Muriel, along with the social network team became part of Telefónica's I+D team, a division of the company in charge for innovation and new products, while Pablo Ledesma became the new director.

Mobile operator (in Spain)

History

Pre-launch phase 
Tuenti launched Tu as a developing project in 2010 supported by Telefónica, which was the largest shareholder back then, aiming to have influence in the young market that the social network had at that time.

Signing up for Tu was free of charge during the initial launching, but it had certain limitations: it was only accessible by invitation (an invitation from a social network user who already had signed up was a requirement, the company sent invitations to random users with this purpose), once an invitation was received users could only sign up for a new number, number portability from another provider was not possible, also, the service was only available on prepaid. The provisioned SIM card was posted nationwide free of charge.

During the pre-launch phase offered plans changed a couple times. First plans launched consisted in weekly, 14 days long or monthly plans which were focused in calls and SMS, as well as free access to the social network after recharging and free TuentiSMS usage. Almost a year later postpaid plans were first launched. Offered plans changed multiple times during this phase and just before the final launch their main focus became bigger data plans.

Final launching 
On 15 February 2012 the company left behind the pre-launch phase of the project and launched Tuenti Móvil for social network users, dropping the name Tu used for the pre-release phase. This official launch came accompanied by brand new plans including competitive data bundles, invitation system was no longer required to access the service and a new advertising campaign within the social network to promote the service. Just a month later new postpaid plans were launched.

One year later, Tuenti announced a better integration between Tuenti Móvil and the social network thanks to its mobile application which included the ability to manage various of the MVNO services and the release of new plans that came with free (unmetered) usage of the social network, making chatting, sharing and doing VoIP calls within the platform totally free of charge or data quota consumption. This new feature was named "ZEROLÍMITES". This proposal aimed to make the whole brand more attractive for current and potential customers and social network users. By that time, the social networking platform experienced an important decrease on active users that presumably migrated to other brand new social platforms.

2014 was an intensive year for the company: this year the company started in Spain the deployment of their own mobile core-network, therefore gaining on independence and enabling them to develop brand new functionalities. At the same time, they also gained presence as a mobile operator on ITU. "VozDigital" was also launched on July, it is a serviced that takes advantage of the current application VoIP functionalities to give customers the possibility to make phone calls using their current phone number and a plan that includes VozDigital minutes. Later, it also became possible to receive calls and make international calls without extra cost.

Mobile operator (overseas) 
Supported by Telefónica and taking benefit of new telecommunications regulations, the brand Tuenti was launched in some Latin-American countries, starting by Mexico. The brand was promoted as a whole-new mobile operator to hit the market, although it works completely based on the Movistar (Telefónica) infrastructure. From the beginning, the offer aimed to a young market: by releasing simple plans (called "Combos") at competitive rates. Both, strategy and offers are slightly different in Latin-American countries to Spain due to technical limits, among other reasons.

Mexico 
June 26, 2014 was the key date for the first official announcement of the international launch: The brand Tuenti started its operations in Mexico. There was a celebration at Campus Party Mexico, giving away for free 2,500 SIM cards for users to provide feedback.

Two years after the brand release, in July 2016 the brand quietly ceases its activity. Customers are migrated automatically to Movistar and Tuenti's social media profiles for Mexico are removed. Sebastian Muriel, CEO of Tuenti, claimed in an interview that the results of the brand in Mexico were not as good as expected due to the monopolistic situation of telephony market.

Argentina 
Tuenti replaced the brand "Quam", also owned by Telefónica on November 18, 2014. Plus, from that moment, users would be able to access Tuenti's mobile application to watch and manage their services.

Peru 
On October, 2014, Peru became the third country in which the brand was released. Peru was also the first country apart from Spain in which VozDigital was launched, enabling customers to make calls (but not to receive them) to any national fixed line or mobile destination through almost any device and just an internet connection.

Ecuador 
The brand was launched on May 29, 2015, with an advertising campaign named "Libérate" (free yourself).

Guatemala  
Brand was launched on June 22, 2017, with a massive media campaign called "Sin Pajas" and were using #SinPajas as principal hashtag campaign.

Social network 
Tuenti was once the most popular social network in Spain and it featured all the tools common to social-networking sites. It allowed users to set up a profile, upload photos and videos, connect and communicate with friends. Many other utilities, such as a chat application, the ability to create events, and tagging locations and places were also offered in the beginning. Unlike similar social networking sites which feature banner advertisements, Tuenti opted out of these traditional forms of obstructive and invasive advertising, in order to respect the privacy of the user.

In later years, as many users left the social platform and some essential functions of the social network were removed, the company changed its focus from its social network to becoming a virtual mobile operator. Keeping the social platform alive was no longer profitable. On February 1, 2016 confidential information was leaked from old employees of the company who claimed that social network closure was imminent. Just a month later, the company launched an update to their mobile application and website that removed all the remaining social networking features, except the chat platform. It also enabled users to download their data for certain period of time, inviting users to download and try the new features such as VozDigital, using their own current phone number to make free calls.

See also 
 Comparison of instant messaging clients
 Comparison of instant messaging protocols
 Comparison of VoIP software
 List of most downloaded Android applications
 Mobile VoIP
 Unified communications

References

External links 
 

Spanish social networking websites
Companies based in the Community of Madrid
Spanish companies established in 2006
Telefónica
Internet technology companies of Spain
Spanish brands